This is a comprehensive listing of official releases by 98 Degrees, an American pop musical group. 98 Degrees has released six studio albums, two compilation albums, fifteen singles, and over ten music videos under Motown Records and Universal Records.

Albums

Studio albums

Compilation albums

Singles

Notes

References

External links
 
 Official biography
 

Discography
Contemporary R&B discographies
Discographies of American artists